The Guacamaya Formation is a geologic formation in Mexico. It preserves fossils dating back to the Permian period.

See also 

 List of fossiliferous stratigraphic units in Mexico

References

External links 
 

Geologic formations of Mexico
Permian Mexico